CA Gen is a Computer Aided Software Engineering (CASE) application development environment marketed by CA Technologies. Gen was previously known as IEF (Information Engineering Facility), Composer by IEF, Composer, COOL:Gen, Advantage:Gen and AllFusion Gen.

The toolset originally supported the information technology engineering methodology developed by Clive Finkelstein, James Martin and others in the early 1980s. Early versions supported IBM's DB2 database, 3270 'block mode' screens and generated COBOL code.

In the intervening years the toolset has been expanded to support additional development techniques such as component-based development; creation of client/server and web applications and generation of C, Java and C#. In addition, other platforms are now supported such as many variants of Unix-like Operating Systems (AIX, HP-UX, Solaris, Linux) as well as Windows.

Its range of supported database technologies have widened to include ORACLE, Microsoft SQL Server, ODBC, JDBC as well as the original DB2.

The toolset is fully integrated - objects identified during analysis carry forward into design without redefinition. All information is stored in a repository (central encyclopedia). The encyclopedia allows for large team development - controlling access so that multiple developers may not change the same object simultaneously.

Overview
It was initially produced by Texas Instruments, with input from James Martin and his consultancy firm James Martin Associates, and was based on the Information Engineering Methodology (IEM). The first version was launched in 1987.

IEF (Information Engineering Facility) became popular among large government departments and public utilities. It initially supported a CICS/COBOL/DB2 target environment.  However, it now supports a wider range of relational databases and operating systems. IEF was intended to shield the developer from the complexities of building complete multi-tier cross-platform applications.

In 1995, Texas Instruments decided to change their marketing focus for the product. Part of this change included a new name - "Composer".

By 1996, IEF had become a popular tool. However, it was criticized by some IT professionals for being too restrictive, as well as for having a high per-workstation cost ($15K USD). But it is claimed that IEF reduces development time and costs by removing complexity and allowing rapid development of large scale enterprise transaction processing systems.

In 1997, Composer had another change of branding, Texas Instruments sold the Texas Instruments Software division, including the Composer rights, to Sterling Software. Sterling software changed the well known name "Information Engineering Facility" to "COOL:Gen". COOL was an acronym for "Common Object Oriented Language" - despite the fact that there was little object orientation in the product.

In 2000, Sterling Software was acquired by Computer Associates (now CA). CA has rebranded the product three times to date and the product is still used widely today. Under CA, recent releases of the tool added support for the CA-Datacom DBMS, the Linux operating system, C# code generation and ASP.NET web clients. The current version is known as CA Gen - version 8 being released in May 2010, with support for customised web services, and more of the toolset being based around the Eclipse framework.

There are a variety of "add-on" tools available for CA Gen, including Project Phoenix from Jumar - a collection of software tools and services focused on the modernisation and re-platforming of existing/legacy CA Gen applications to new environments, GuardIEn - a Configuration Management and Developer Productivity Suite, QAT Wizard, an interview style wizard that takes advantage of the meta model in Gen, products for multi-platform application reporting and XML/SOAP enabling of Gen applications., and developer productivity tools such as Access Gen, APMConnect, QA Console and Upgrade Console from Response Systems 
Recently CA GEN has released its latest version 8.6.

References

External links
 CA Gen official site
 Capgemini REGENERATE offering - Support, Update, Migrate
 CA Gen EDGE - sponsored by the EDGE User Group
 QAT Global - CA Gen Services and Training Provider (USA)
 Deloitte Consulting - CA Gen Product and Service Provider
 IET - CA Gen Product and Services Provider (UK)
 Jumar Solutions - CA Gen Product and Services Provider (UK)
 Response Systems - CA Gen Product and Services Provider (UK)
 Facet Consulting - CA Gen Services Provider (Australia)
 Canam Software Labs, Inc. - CA Gen Product and Service Provider (Canada)

Computer-aided software engineering tools
Data management
CA Technologies
Fourth-generation programming languages